Ryukuaster is a monotypic genus of echinoderms belonging to the family Goniasteridae. The only species is Ryukuaster onnae.

The species is found in Japan.

References

Goniasteridae
Asteroidea genera
Monotypic echinoderm genera